Hana Librová (born 26 November 1943 in Brno, Protectorate of Bohemia and Moravia) is a Czech biologist, sociologist and environmentalist. She founded the Department of Environmental Studies at Masaryk University. She has carried out research on environmental lifestyle and environmental values.

Biography
She studied biology at the Jan Evangelista Purkyně University (former name of Masaryk University). Since 1968 she worked at the Department of Sociology at the Jan Evangelista Purkyně University. In 1997 she was appointed as a professor of sociology. In 1999 Hana Librová established the Department of Environmental Studies.

Personal life
Hana Librová is a sister of prof. Jana Nechutová, classical philologist. She is married and has a daughter.

Selected works
 Sociální potřeba a hodnota krajiny. Brno: Spisy FF UJEP, 1987, 135 s.
 Láska ke krajině?, Brno: Blok, 1988, 168 s.
 Pestří a zelení. Kapitoly o dobrovolné skromnosti, Brno: Hnutí Duha a Veronica, 1994, 218 s. 
 The Disparate Roots of Voluntary Modesty. Environmental values, 1999, No. 3, pp. 369–379. ISSN 0963-2719
 Vlažní a váhaví: Kapitoly o ekologickém luxusu. Brno: Doplněk, 2003, 320 s. 
 Proč chráníme přírodu?: Dvakrát na obhajobu ochránců přírody. Vesmír, 2005, č. 3, s. 171-177. ISSN 1214-4029

References

1943 births
Living people
Scientists from Brno
Czech biologists
Czech sociologists
Czech environmentalists
Czech women environmentalists
Masaryk University alumni
Academic staff of Masaryk University